"This Is the Way" is a song by Swedish musician Bo Martin Erik Erikson, known under the pseudonym of E-Type. It features vocals by Swedish singer Nana Hedin and was released in 1994 as the second single from his debut album, Made in Sweden (1994). The single reached number-one in Sweden, and also peaked at number four in Denmark and number 18 in Finland. In France, it reached number 14 and remained for twenty weeks in the top 50. On the Eurochart Hot 100, the song peaked at number 40 in November 1994. Outside Europe, it was successful in Israel, reaching number seven and also number 15 on the US Billboard Hot Dance Club Play chart. E-Type won the prize for best Swedish dance track 1996 at the 1997 Swedish Dance Music Awards with "This Is the Way".

Music video
The accompanying music video of "This Is the Way" was directed by Swedish-based director Matt Broadley.

Track listings
 CD single
 "This Is the Way" (radio edit) — 3:54
 "This Is the Way" (waterdreamix) — 6:50

 CD maxi
 "This Is the Way" (radio edit) — 3:54
 "This Is the Way" (waterdreamix) — 6:50
 "This Is the Way" (extended) — 6:44
 "Me No Want Miseria (Take Me to the End)" — 4:49

Charts

Weekly charts

Year-end charts

Certifications

References

1994 songs
1995 singles
E-Type (musician) songs
Nana Hedin songs
Number-one singles in Sweden
Song recordings produced by Denniz Pop
Song recordings produced by Max Martin
Polydor Records singles
Music videos directed by Matt Broadley
English-language Swedish songs